303 is a year of the Julian calendar.

303 may also refer to:

 303 (number)
 Area code 303, a telephone code assigned to central Colorado
 Roland TB-303, a bass synthesizer
 .303 British, the .303" calibre rifle and machine-gun cartridge
 303 (comics), comic book miniseries by Garth Ennis and Jacen Burrows
 Prometheus (Stargate), also called BC-303 or X-303, fictional spacecraft in the Stargate SG-1 television show
 3OH!3, an electropop band from Boulder, Colorado
 "303",  also used in Australia and New Zealand to refer to the Lee–Enfield rifle
 "303", a song by Kula Shaker from the album K
 HTTP 303, a status code for "See other"
 SOP 303, a National Communications System standard operating procedure to turn off mobile communications
 303 (band), a British girl group
Pearson 303, an American sailboat design
 303 Squadron (disambiguation), several military units